Xanthogaleruca is a genus of beetles belonging to the family Chrysomelidae. These elm leaf beetles are pests that feed on ornamental plants until they are stripped of their leaves entirely.

Species
The genus includes the following species:
 Xanthogaleruca aenescens (Fairmaire, 1878)
 Xanthogaleruca flavescens (Weise, 1887)
 Xanthogaleruca luteola (O.F. Müller, 1776)
 Xanthogaleruca maculicollis (Motschulsky, 1854)
 Xanthogaleruca nigromarginata (Jacoby, 1885)
 Xanthogaleruca orientalis (Ogloblin, 1936)
 Xanthogaleruca seminigra (Jacoby, 1885)
 Xanthogaleruca subaenea (Ogloblin, 1936)
 Xanthogaleruca subcoerulescens (Weise, 1884)
 Xanthogaleruca yuae Lee & Bezděk, 2021

References

Galerucinae
Beetles of Asia
Beetles of Europe
Beetles of North America
Chrysomelidae genera